Ribeira da Vinha is a village in the central part of the island of Sao Vicente, Cape Verde. It is situated in the plain southwest of the island capital Mindelo, approximately 3 km from the city centre.

References

Villages and settlements in São Vicente, Cape Verde